Seabrook is an unincorporated community and census-designated place (CDP) in Prince George's County, Maryland, United States, located approximately  east of Washington, D.C.. Per the 2020 census, the population was 19,627. Prior to 2010, Seabrook was part of the Lanham-Seabrook census-designated place.

Etymology
Seabrook takes its name from Thomas Seabrook, who was a topographical engineer with the Pennsylvania Railroad. He originally built three cottages and a park with fenced-in tame deer in the area near the rail station in the early 1870s.

History
A school was built in Seabrook in 1895.

The community developed in direct relationship with the Washington Branch of the Baltimore and Potomac Railroad. The railroad's main branch into Washington opened in July 1872, with stations established at Glenn Dale, Seabrook, and Lanham, among others.  Thomas Seabrook, an engineer for the railroad, purchased  of land in 1871 around the location of a planned station for the purpose of creating a retreat community. By 1880, a station building and three Gothic cottages had been built, followed by commercial buildings and a schoolhouse. By 1914, the community remained small with just a few buildings located at the intersection of Seabrook Road with the railroad. By 1957, the community had grown to include approximately 185 houses along 10 streets. The streets were arranged in a grid pattern roughly parallel to the railroad line. The community extended from present-day Good Luck Road south to Annapolis Road.

Residential development continued on vacant lots within the community throughout the 20th century, while commercial development focused along the main roads. Commercial strip development is located along Annapolis Road and Lanham-Severn Road. The original railroad station and early commercial buildings are no longer extant, though the old schoolhouse and a few of the early dwellings survive.

Most of the more recently built Seabrook (some of which was originally called Seabrook Acres) is a development of red brick homes along the Lanham-Severn Road, now Maryland Route 564 in Maryland, approximately one half mile east of the Capital Beltway. Many of its homes were built in the 1950s to serve the needs of new employees at the newly established NASA Goddard Space Flight Center, which is located immediately to the north.  Development of apartment complexes and other large structures has occurred during recent years of developer expansion. However, Seabrook remains a residential area with numerous single homes surrounded by green lawns shaded by century-old oak trees.

Geography

Demographics

2020 census

Note: the US Census treats Hispanic/Latino as an ethnic category. This table excludes Latinos from the racial categories and assigns them to a separate category. Hispanics/Latinos can be of any race.

Businesses
Seabrook has its own MARC commuter rail station (Seabrook Station). Seabrook residents are served by a large number of small businesses, including restaurants, fast foot eateries, banks, lawyer services, laundry services, veterinary services, car repair, and numerous other businesses which are located at the Seabrook Station.

Lanham-Seabrook

Lanham, Maryland, an older community, lies to the west on both sides of the Washington Beltway. Within the Lanham-Seabrook area, there is only one post office (20706), located a half mile east of Seabrook Station on route 564, which both towns must share. As a result, since the post office has been designated "Lanham", all mail to both the Seabrook and Lanham area is town-designated as "Lanham" or "Lanham-Seabrook".

Government
Prince George's County Police Department District 2 Station in Brock Hall CDP, with a Bowie postal address, serves the community.

The U.S. Postal Service operates the Lanham Seabrook Post Office in Lanham CDP.

Education
Prince George's County Public Schools serves Seabrook.

Zoned elementary schools serving the CDP include Robert Frost, Gaywood, Magnolia, and Catherine T. Reed.

Thomas Johnson Middle School serves most of Seabrook CDP while Greenbelt Middle School serves a portion.

DuVal High School serves most of Seabrook CDP while Eleanor Roosevelt High School serves a portion.

Notable people
Rodney McGruder, NBA player
Quinn Ojinnaka, professional wrestler and former American football player

References

 
Census-designated places in Maryland
Census-designated places in Prince George's County, Maryland